David John Warburton  (born 28 October 1965) is a British politician serving as Member of Parliament (MP) for Somerton and Frome. On his election in the 2015 general election he represented the Conservative Party, but was suspended from the party in April 2022 pending the outcome of an Independent Complaints and Grievance Scheme (ICGS) investigation into allegations of harassment and drug abuse. Prior to entering politics, he was the founder, chief executive and chairman of Pitch Entertainment Group.

Early life
Warburton was born on 28 October 1965 in Reading, Berkshire. He was educated at the state grammar Reading School, and the co-educational comprehensive secondary, Waingels College.

After a variety of jobs, including several years as a shop assistant, a cleaner and a van driver while singing, playing lead guitar and keyboards in a succession of rock bands, he studied at the Royal College of Music, where he was a recipient of the Octavia Scholarship. He graduated with a diploma in music composition. While there, he studied under Edwin Roxburgh and Jeremy Dale Roberts, and also with George Benjamin. He was the composition faculty representative on the Student Association Committee. He gained a M.Mus. degree at King's College London.

He then studied towards an M.Phil. and Ph.D. at King's College, London as a Ralph Vaughan Williams Trust Scholar, under the supervision of Sir Harrison Birtwistle.  Though also a Sir Richard Stapley Educational Trust Scholar, he eventually left the course early due to a lack of funding.

Warburton taught for five years at an inner-city mixed community school, Hurlingham and Chelsea Secondary School, as a classroom and peripatetic teacher of music.

Business career
Warburton founded The Music Solution Ltd (TMS) in 1999, initially providing downloadable music content to mobile phone networks and brands. As chief executive, he expanded TMS to become a service provider, offering website and mobile website branding and design, mobile content and its associated delivery, integrated payment systems and customer service on behalf of brands including the BBC, Celador, News International, Motorola, Real Networks, MTV Europe, and Kazaa.

Following a trademark battle in 2001, where British Telecom prevented TMS from using the brand Yellphone.com by claiming ownership of the name, Warburton was forced to change TMS's primary consumer brand to SplashMobile.com.

By 2005, TMS had become Pitch Entertainment Group, headquartered in Covent Garden, with operations in Australasia, Asia, South Africa,
the US and across Europe. With Warburton as executive chairman, Pitch launched the first example of a mobile social network with ancillary content, and in 2007 was listed by The Sunday Times as the UK's 6th fastest growing technology company, having achieved sales growth of 326% a year.

Pitch partnered with Third Screen Media in 2006 to expand into the new arena of mobile advertising and expanded the service across its network. Warburton featured both on the front cover of the business newspaper City A.M. in August 2006 under the heading "The musician who became lord of the ringtones" and in its "Job of the Week" section. In 2008, after continued growth it was announced that Pitch had been acquired for an undisclosed sum by US mobile content provider PlayPhone Inc.

In 2009, Warburton set up the listed building property restoration and development companies Oflang Ltd. and Oflang Partners LLP, and with Loaye Agabani and Tim Lewis launched the online business MyHigh.St in Somerset in 2012. MyHigh.St allows local independent retailers to offer their products online, organised by local high street areas.

Political career
Warburton was Treasurer of Wells Conservative Association from 2009 to 2010 and its Political Deputy Chairman and Constituency Spokesperson from 2010 to 2012.

In February 2013 he was selected as a parliamentary candidate for Somerton and Frome. He was a candidate during the winter flooding of 2013–14 on the Somerset Levels, and campaigned for flood alleviation works. As candidate, he campaigned for improved broadband, local charities, rail connectivity, new schools, dualling of the arterial A303 road through Somerset, and reduced duty, regulation and VAT on pub sales.

At the 2015 general election, he was elected with 53% of the vote and, at 18.3%, the largest constituency swing to the Conservative Party after David Heath, who held the seat for the Liberal Democrats since 1997, stepped down. As an MP, he has petitioned Downing Street to prevent the EU imposing excise duty on sales of small-scale cider producers.

In April 2016, Warburton was one of five Conservative MPs to rebel by voting against the Government whip in favour of an opposition amendment tabled by Lord Dubs demanding that Britain take in vulnerable children from refugee camps in Calais and Dunkirk, which presaged an eventual Government U-turn.

Warburton sits on several all-party parliamentary groups (APPGs). He was elected the Chair of the British Council APPG, Chair of the APPG for Music and Vice-Chair of both the APPG for Blockchain and the APPG for Small and Micro Business. He is Secretary of the APPG on Eggs, Pigs and Poultry, and Treasurer of the APPG for Taxation.

Since January 2017, he has sat on the European Scrutiny Committee, and between 2016 and 2017 chaired the British Council's Building Resilience to Radicalisation Inquiry, exploring the roots of extremism and drivers of radicalisation as set out in the UN Plan of Action to Prevent Violent Extremism. The inquiry report was published in November 2017.

Warburton was re-elected at the 2017 general election with an increased vote share of 57% and an increased majority of 22,906, and in January 2018 he was appointed as Parliamentary Private Secretary to the Department for Education.

Warburton employs his wife as a personal assistant on a salary up to £25,000. He was listed in Daily Telegraph and Guardian articles in 2015 criticising the practice of MPs employing family members, on the lines that it promotes nepotism. Although MPs who were first elected in 2017 have been banned from employing family members, the restriction is not retrospective – meaning that Warburton's employment of his wife is lawful.

In January 2016, the Labour Party unsuccessfully proposed an amendment in Parliament that would have required private landlords to make their homes "fit for human habitation". According to Parliament's register of interests, Warburton was one of 72 Conservative MPs who voted against the amendment who personally derived an income from renting out property. The Conservative Government had responded to the amendment saying they believed homes should be fit for human habitation but did not want to pass the new law that would explicitly require it.

In September 2019, Warburton said that his family had received death threats over the issue of Brexit in response to Adam Boyden, his Liberal Democrat opponent.

Withdrawal of whip
In April 2022, he had the Conservative whip withdrawn pending the outcome of an investigation by Parliament's ICGS into allegations that he sexually harassed three women. Following his suspension, he said he had not been notified of the details of the allegations by the ICGS but that he denied them. Warburton allegedly asked for cocaine to be bought. The woman complainant said he got into bed with her, naked. She alleged that he ground against her and groped her breasts after she stated repeatedly she did not want sex with him.

Warburton was admitted to a psychiatric hospital. His wife said he was suffering from severe shock and stress following the allegations.

In November 2022 Parliamentary Commissioner for Standards found that in 2015 Warburton received a 150,000 GBP loan from a Russian businessman Roman Joukovski through a Seychelles shell company and did not declare it.

In February 2023, Warburton was claimed to have failed to disclose a £25,000 donation from a billionaire, to have used a forged document in an £800,000 mortgage application, and to have concealed an interest in a property firm.

Personal life
He married public relations professional Harriet Baker-Bates (born 1969) in 2002. She is the daughter of the diplomat Merrick Baker-Bates CMG, former Deputy High Commissioner to Malaysia and British Consul General in Los Angeles.

Warburton is a member of Mensa, and a Fellow of the Royal Society of Arts. Until 2017 he was a Trustee of the Down's Syndrome support charity Ups and Downs Southwest and he is a Trustee of the national youth music charity Music for Youth.  He is also a Trustee of British Youth Music Theatre.

References

External links

MyHigh.St website
Oflang Partners LLP website
Royal College of Music Junior Department website

1965 births
Alumni of King's College London
Alumni of the Royal College of Music
Conservative Party (UK) MPs for English constituencies
Independent members of the House of Commons of the United Kingdom
Living people
People educated at Reading School
UK MPs 2015–2017
UK MPs 2017–2019
UK MPs 2019–present
Mensans